Gradkowski/ Grądkowski (feminine: Gradkowska/ Grądkowska, plural: Gradkowscy/ Grądkowscy) is a Polish surname. Notable people with the name include:

  (1916-1978), Polish boxer
 Bruce Gradkowski (born 1983), American football quarterback
  (born 1952), Polish sculpturist
 Gino Gradkowski (born 1988), American football center
 , Polish philosopher
 Mark Gradkowski, 1980 Indiana State Sycamores football team, All-Missouri Valley Conference

Polish-language surnames